Thomas Eric Duncan (December 30, 1972 – October 8, 2014) was a Liberian citizen who became the first Ebola patient diagnosed in the United States on September 30, 2014.

 Two health care workers became infected with Ebola virus, 26-year-old nurse Nina Pham and 29-year-old nurse Amber Vinson, both of whom had taken care of him at Texas Health Presbyterian Hospital (THPH).

The family eventually threatened to sue the hospital based on the claim that Duncan had not received proper and timely care. The family was thus able to receive compensation from THPH. On November 10, 2014, Duncan's family reached a "resolution" with THPH that included the hospital covering the expenses related to Duncan's intensive and onerous treatment, as well as an undisclosed amount cash payment to the family.

Background 
Duncan

Contraction of Ebola

Timeline of contraction and initial symptoms

Treatment and death 
 Duncan died at 7:51 am on October 8, 2014.

Other infected 

On the night of October 10, Nina Pham, a 26-year-old nurse who had treated Duncan at Texas Health Presbyterian Hospital, reported a low-grade fever and was placed in isolation. On October 11, she tested positive for Ebola virus, becoming the first person to contract the virus in the U.S. On October 12, the CDC confirmed the positive test results.  Hospital officials said Pham had worn the recommended protective gear when treating Duncan on his second visit to the hospital and had "extensive contact" with him on "multiple occasions".

Pham claimed that "she doubts whether she can ever be a critical care nurse again – in part because of the emotional stress and anxiety over the trauma she experienced and in part because of the fear and stigma that follows her". She sued the hospital and settled for an undisclosed amount of money.

On October 14, a second nurse at the same hospital, identified as 29-year-old Amber Joy Vinson, reported a fever. Vinson was among the nurses who had provided treatment for Duncan. Vinson was isolated within 90 minutes of reporting the fever. By the next day, Vinson had tested positive for Ebola virus. On October 13, Vinson had flown Frontier Airlines Flight 1143 from Cleveland to Dallas, after spending the weekend in Tallmadge and Akron, Ohio.

Reactions

See also 
 Index case

References

1972 births
2014 deaths
Deaths from Ebola
Infectious disease deaths in Texas
People from Monrovia
Index cases
Liberian expatriates in the United States
20th-century Liberian people
21st-century Liberian people